Anticlinura atlantica is a species of sea snail, a marine gastropod mollusk in the family Mangeliidae.

Description
The length of the shell attains 7 mm.

Distribution
This species occurs in the Gulf of Mexico off Louisiana and Alabama.

References

 Rolán E. & Otero-Schmitt J. (1999). The family Turridae s. l. (Molluscs, Neogastropoda) in Angola. 2. Subfamily Mangeliinae Fischer, 1883. Argonauta 13(1): 5-26

External links
 García E.F. 2005. Six new deep-water molluscan species (Gastropoda: Epitoniidae, Conoidea) from the Gulf of Mexico. Novapex, 6(4): 79-87
 

atlantica
Gastropods described in 2005